John Markopoulos  (1951–2004) was a Greek businessman. He was majority shareholder of Proton Bank.

Life
Markopoulos studied at the University of Thessalonica, and graduate studies (MBA) at the INSEAD University in Fontainebleau, France. He worked as a financial analyst in Steyr-Daimler-Puch in Vienna and as a manager in Chase Manhattan Bank in London.

In 1990, he founded Sigma Securities S.A. where he held the positions of chairman and managing director until the year 2000, when the company was acquired by Piraeus Bank. Sigma Securities was the first private societe anonyme securities house in Greece, and became the top ranked securities house in the domestic market.

In 2001, Markopoulos co-founded the Proton Bank group, a specialised financial services group engaging in the provision of investment and asset management services.

References

Businesspeople from Athens
1951 births
2004 deaths
Smyrniote Greeks
20th-century Greek businesspeople